Andy Barclay is a fictional character and protagonist of the Child's Play horror film series. He is a young boy who, after receiving a Good Guy doll for his sixth birthday, is the prime suspect in a series of mysterious murders. In reality the murders are being committed by the doll, which was possessed by serial killer Charles Lee Ray (aka Chucky). The duo go on to become archenemies. Andy Barclay is portrayed by actor Alex Vincent in the original Child's Play film, Child's Play 2, Curse of Chucky, Cult of Chucky and in the Chucky television series. Justin Whalin played Andy in Child's Play 3, while Gabriel Bateman played Andy in the 2019 reboot of Child's Play. Andy is mentioned, but does not appear in Bride of Chucky and Seed of Chucky.

History

Child's Play (1988)

Andy Barclay is celebrating his sixth birthday and really wants a Good Guy doll for his present. He even makes his mother breakfast in bed, to show her how good he is. However, the dolls are too expensive for her salary, and he ends up getting clothes instead. Seeing her son's disappointment, after she drops him off at daycare, Karen buys a doll for half price from a peddler unaware that the doll is possessed by the soul of a serial killer named Charles Lee Ray. Karen takes the doll back home to him, and he is very overjoyed to have a new best friend.

As Karen must go back to work, her best friend Maggie volunteers to babysit. The night goes by uneventfully until Maggie tells him that it is time for bed. Andy says that his doll, Chucky, wants to stay up to watch the 9 o'clock news. Thinking he is lying, she sends him to go brush his teeth but confronts him again when she finds Chucky on the couch with the TV on. Although Andy denies moving Chucky to the couch, she thinks Andy is really joking. She tucks him into bed, then goes to read a book. Later that night, when Maggie mysteriously falls to her death from the window, Andy is questioned by detective Mike Norris. During the investigation, Karen comes back home and is angered by Norris falsely implying that her son had something to do with Maggie's death. She kicks the detectives out and then goes to check on her son. She sees him talking to his doll, and thinks it is innocent enough until Andy says that the doll told him, "Aunt Maggie was a real b**** and got what she deserved."

The next day, Chucky gets Andy to bring him to the house of Chucky's former accomplice, Eddie Caputo. While Andy goes to urinate, Chucky manages to blow up the building, killing Eddie. The detectives are called in to check out the scene and again find Andy there. As they see this as more than a coincidence, they get Dr. Ardmore to monitor as Jack questions, Andy. When Jack asks why Maggie fell out of the window, Andy says that she saw Chucky, and it scared her so much she fell down. Karen comes to Andy's side, and explains that no one believes him; if he does not tell the truth, the police will take him away from her. Afraid, Andy confronts Chucky, begging him to say something. As he simply repeats his doll lines, he runs to his mother, telling her Chucky is doing it on purpose and would kill him if he ever told anyone about him. From behind the glass, Dr. Ardmore announces his presence. Seeing more than enough, he suggests Andy stay a few days at the hospital, and with no real choice, Karen reluctantly hands over her son.

At his hospital room, Andy hears Chucky coming up the stairs and screams for Dr. Ardmore to help which he does nothing. Chucky manages to get into Andy's room, but by that time Andy had escaped. Andy finds his way downstairs and into the operating room, followed by Chucky. After being knocked to the ground by Chucky, he picks a scalpel up and prepares to defend himself. However, he is seized by Dr. Ardmore, who puts him on the bed. Despite Andy's claims that Chucky is in the room, Ardmore goes to sedate him. Before he can do it though, Chucky kills Ardmore, allowing Andy to escape the hospital.

Andy makes it back to the apartment, but Chucky follows him. Chucky knocks him unconscious with a baseball bat and begins the ritual to transfer his soul. Luckily Norris and Karen burst in just in time to save Andy. After a brief fight, Karen throws Chucky into the fireplace, and despite Chucky's pleading, Andy lights a match and sets Chucky on fire. Hearing Norris in the bedroom, the two go to his side, and Karen tells Andy to retrieve the first aid kit from under the sink. However, as he goes, he notices that Chucky is missing from the fireplace. Completely charred, Chucky chases Andy, who runs back to the bedroom. Karen shoots him several times, missing his heart, but knocking off his head.

Jack later arrives and brings the doll's head into the bedroom. Unbeknownst to him, Chucky's body breaks through the air vent behind Jack and strangles him. As Karen pulls Chucky's body off Jack, Mike shoots him in the heart, finally killing him. Fearfully looking at Chucky's remains, Andy leaves with Karen and Jack to take Mike to the hospital.

Child's Play 2

Now eight years old, Andy is sent to a foster home with Phil and Joanne Simpson, as his mother Karen is undergoing a psychiatric evaluation after what transpired in the previous movie. Although the family is very nice, they become suspicious the next morning when one of Joanne's antiques is broken (by Chucky, who used the antique to destroy the family's existing Good Guy doll). Both Andy and his foster sister Kyle deny doing anything, so Phil sends them to do the laundry. Later that night, Chucky manages to track Andy down and invades the house, and goes into Andy's room. He ties him to the bed and begins the voodoo chant to transfer his soul. However, before he can finish, Kyle sneaks back into the house through Andy's window after seeing her boyfriend. She tries to untie Andy as Phil and Joanne walk in on them. They accuse Kyle of tying up Andy as a sick joke and ignore Andy's pleas that the doll is alive. Chucky is thrown in the basement by Phil. Chucky realizes he has a nosebleed, which he attributes because he is becoming more human as time goes on.

The next morning, Andy goes to his first day of school, and Chucky follows. While his teacher Miss Kettlewell is reading a story to the class, there is a disruption by a bully teasing Andy. She thinks Andy is the source and scolds him for it. During recess, Chucky enters the classroom and writes obscenities on Andy's test paper. When the day is over, Miss Kettlewell uncovers the paper and forces him to stay after school for detention. She mistakenly locks him inside the classroom after throwing Chucky in the closet, while she leaves to phone Phil. Andy tries to call for help from anybody on the other side of the locked door, but to no avail. Chucky begins shouting from the closet for Andy to let him out, but Andy instead escapes by opening the window and running home. Miss Kettlewell returns to the classroom to find Andy gone. Hearing a sound from the closet and believing Andy is hiding within, she opens the door to reveal a fully alive Chucky. Chucky stabs her with an air pump that knocks her back, after which he beats her to death with a yardstick.

When Andy comes home, Phil confronts him about his test paper, and Andy explains that Chucky did it. Phil takes him to the basement to prove the doll is not alive and surprisingly, Chucky is there. In the middle of the night, Andy hears a sound coming from downstairs. He arms himself with a knife and proceeds into the basement. From there he is attacked by Chucky but is saved by Phil coming downstairs. Andy tries to warn Phil about Chucky, but Chucky trips him, causing him to fall and break his neck. When Joanne finds Phil's dead body, she blames Andy for Phil's death and sends him back to the orphanage.

While at the orphanage, the fire alarm is pulled, Andy and his caseworker Grace run into Kyle as they try to evacuate. Grace blames Kyle, who is being held at knifepoint by Chucky, and pulls her and Andy back to her office. When Grace takes the doll from Kyle, Chucky pulls out his knife and stabs the caseworker to death. Chucky grabs Andy and forces him to go to the Play Pals factory, with Kyle running after them. From there, he knocks Andy unconscious and begins to say the chant. However, the chant fails; Chucky is trapped in his doll form forever. Enraged, Chucky goes to kill Andy but is subdued by Kyle. She takes Andy and runs through the factory, while Chucky tries to stop them. But before getting them, Andy pours molten plastic on Chucky, partially melting his head. Andy and Kyle then jam an air hose into his mouth, causing his head to explode, finally killing him. Both Andy and Kyle leave the factory together, towards uncertain futures.

Child's Play 3

Eight years later, Andy is now sixteen years old. He has been thrown out of numerous foster homes, and Social Services has enrolled him in a military academy as a last destination. The head of the school, Cochran, agrees to let Andy in because he has had a rough life, but tells him to grow up and forget the killer doll fantasies. Andy is placed in a bunk with another student, Harold Whitehurst, who he finds bound and gagged in their closet. This was done by Cadet/Lieutenant/Colonel Brett Shelton, who uses his position to bully Andy. Regardless of Shelton's bullying, he is able to keep his friend Whitehurst; he also meets another student named Kristen De Silva, and the two develop a strong romantic relationship.

Unbeknownst to Andy, Chucky has shipped himself to the academy, in order to transfer his soul into his now teenaged nemesis. During the night, he confronts Andy in his room and reveals his plan to transfer his soul into a different child's body: Ronald Tyler, an 8-year-old returning cadet whom Andy had befriended when he first arrived at the academy. Tyler was tasked with delivering a package to Andy (which was in fact Chucky) earlier, but Tyler realized it was a Good Guy doll and planned to keep it for himself. When Chucky burst free from the package, he was initially furious that Tyler didn't take the package to Andy, but soon realizes it would be way easier to possess this unsuspecting new child. Chucky now plans to kill Andy so he can't stop him but Andy thwarts him off until Shelton enters the room. He finds Andy slamming Chucky against the floor, and rudely takes Chucky from him. The next morning, Andy approaches Tyler and asks him about Chucky and not to trust him, mentioning all the bad Chucky did when he was a little boy. Tyler snaps that he is just jealous that Chucky did not pick him first. Still worried for Tyler's life and knowing he must be a protector like his mother Karen and his foster sister Kyle were to him when he was younger, Andy decides to give him a pocket knife in case Chucky tries to transfer his soul into Tyler's body again and he is not around to protect him.

When the school's annual paintball war begins, Andy sneaks off to find Tyler, who had run away from Chucky in the woods. Realizing that Andy was right and that Chucky is truly alive and evil, Tyler stabs the doll with the pocket knife and escapes. He later meets up with Andy and the rest of the blue team. Chucky next attacks Kristen, using her as a hostage to lure out Andy and exchange Tyler for her. After their exchange, the red team comes into the area, and instead of shooting paintballs, they shoot live bullets that Chucky secretly placed in their guns. In the chaos, Tyler briefly escapes only to find himself once again held hostage by Chucky. Kristen and Andy follow Chucky and Tyler into a haunted house at a nearby carnival.

In an attempt to keep her from rescuing Tyler, Chucky shoots Kristen in the leg, leaving Andy to fight him alone. After a struggle, Tyler is knocked out, and Chucky begins his ritual chant. However, before he finishes, Andy reaches them on the top of a skull-covered mountain prop. He shoots Chucky in the arm and chest, causing Chucky to lose his weapon. Even after being disarmed, Chucky pounces on Andy and attempts to strangle him. Tyler awakens and gives Andy his pocket knife from earlier. Andy uses it to slice off Chucky's remaining hand, causing the doll to fall into a giant fan that shreds him to pieces. After leaving the haunted house, Andy visits Kristen, who is being treated by medics, and allows himself to be arrested. Andy is last seen riding off in the backseat of a police car.

Bride of Chucky

Andy is briefly mentioned in a newspaper article titled "Boy claims doll possessed by killer's soul".

Seed of Chucky

Andy is indirectly mentioned by Chucky during his "what's so great about being human anyway" speech by referencing his numerous victims and enemies.

Curse of Chucky

Six months after Chucky attacked Nica, the adult Andy gets a package delivered, and brings it inside. Before opening it, he receives a phone call from his mother, Karen. As Andy talks about his birthday dinner at Karen's place, Chucky cuts his way out of the box. Ready to kill, Chucky turns around, only to see Andy pointing a shotgun directly at his face. When Chucky shockingly says Andy, Andy says to play with this to Chucky, and before Chucky can explain where Andy has been since Child's Play 3, Andy fires his shotgun through Chucky's head.

Cult of Chucky

After the events of Curse of Chucky, Andy now keeps Chucky's severed head to torture in retribution for his crimes. Tapes later reveal that Andy had tried to prove Nica Pierce's innocence by showing Chucky to her psychiatrist Dr. Foley, but it was dismissed as special effects. Learning that Chucky had managed to transfer his soul into multiple Good Guy dolls, Andy sends a Good Guy that he had shaved to the asylum and drives there. When he is unable to get in due to visiting hours being over, he commits himself by punching the security guard, being locked in a cell. When a Chucky doll he previously maimed arrives at his cell to kill him, Andy restrains the doll and rips a gun out of the doll's stomach. Andy shoots the short-haired Chucky three times and stomps its head in, killing it instantly. When Nica, now possessed by Chucky's soul, arrives at his cell, Andy attempts to shoot her but his gun jams. Chucky/Nica then locks Andy inside of his cell and escapes, but it is later implied that Andy had escaped the hospital to find and track down the remaining Chucky dolls with his foster sister Kyle after he sent her to his cabin to torture the still alive Chucky head from the first seven films.

Chucky (TV Series)

After the events of the film Cult of Chucky, in the premiere of Chucky the series, Andy calls Jake after he posts online finding a Good Guy Doll and he's selling it. Andy tells Jake if the doll's name is Chucky he is possessed and to check to see if he has batteries to believe him. Andy asks who is there implying someone is at his location and the phone goes dead.

In the sixth episode of the series, Andy and his foster sister, Kyle, are seen hunting down the remaining possessed Chucky dolls. After entering a family's home, Chucky reveals himself to Andy while holding a knife to a child's throat, Andy shoots Chucky in the head with his pistol and then continues to shoot him with Kyle by his side and he is finally dead.  

Later in the same episode, Andy is contacted by Jake Wheeler and Devon Evans in hopes of help with defeating Chucky. Andy and Kyle pick up the phone, and ask Jake for his location and how many people he has told about the murderous doll.

In the seventh episode of the series, Andy had left his foster sister Kyle behind at a gas station for her own good and at the end of the episode, Andy rings the doorbell of Junior Wheeler's house with Chucky and his protege Junior (who just got through murdering his father) looking on from the window.

The season finale picks up directly after the ending of episode 7, with Junior letting Andy inside the house. Andy asks for Jake, under the guise of being a collector of Good Guy dolls whom Jake was going to sell Chucky to. After asking Junior if he knows where his father or Chucky could be (as he slyly investigates the house), Junior lies, claiming that his father must've left and took the doll with him. Seemingly convinced, Andy leaves the house. Later in the episode, Andy arrives at Charles Lee Ray's old house and rescues Devon, who had been held hostage by Chucky/Nica the previous night. Devon quickly warns Andy that Tiffany had rigged a bomb to go off at the front door as a death trap if anyone opens it and Andy takes caution. Kyle arrives at the house, calling out Andy's name. Chucky decides to use the generic Good Guy Doll voice to sound like a child crying for help in order to lure Kyle to the front door and trick her into opening it. Andy attempts to warn Kyle about the bomb but it appears to be too late, as the bomb destroys the house and presumably takes the lives of Andy, Devon, and Kyle. However, Andy is ultimately revealed to have survived the explosion, along with Devon, who'd originally believed Andy to be dead after he managed to escape. Andy had hidden out in the delivery truck carrying the boxes of Good Guy dolls (which Chucky had possessed at the end of episode 7) at the town's benefit screening of Frankenstein. Andy knocks out the truck's driver, and takes the wheel. Before he drives off to apparently destroy the dolls, he shares a brief glance with Jake, Devon, and Lexy (who are standing outside of the theater after defeating the Chuckys inside), and gives them a thumbs up and a silent nod. As he makes his exit, he flips off an upset Tiffany and leaves Hackensack. The doll version of Tiffany suddenly appears and holds Andy at gunpoint and tells him to drive the truck to the airport so the Good Guy dolls can still be shipped out, however Andy foils this plan by driving the truck off a cliff.  

He is not seen again until season 2, episode 5, where Lexy and Devon discover a cabin on the outskirts of the Incarnate Lord School while on a search for the source of the Chuckys in the school. In this cabin, they discover Andy, revealed to have survived the crash, held captive alongside Dr. Mixter and being tortured by The Colonel, a bald-headed Chucky that had also survived the crash. Lexy and Devon free Andy, and he returns to the school. He kills The Colonel but is disturbed to see another Chucky doll, named Good Chucky, who had seemingly undergone a redemption at the hands of Jake and Devon; Andy's suspicions are proven accurate when Chucky takes over Good Chucky's psyche and kills Lexy's roommate, Nadine. Andy reunites with Kyle, who had faked her death, and he assists the school's headmaster, Father Bryce, with performing an exorcism on Good Chucky to send Chucky to Hell. After Nica Pierce performs a voodoo ritual to transfer Chucky Prime - the Chucky who had possessed her over a year earlier - into Good Chucky's body, Dr. Mixter and Chucky Prime flee. Andy chases them down and kills Chucky Prime, but Dr. Mixter escapes. Andy and Kyle, now finally considering themselves free from Chucky, leave the school to an optimistic future.

Other appearances
 In 1991, Andy appeared in 3 issues (1,2, & 5) of the "Child's Play" comics, which were based on the first film. He was also in all issues based on Child's Play 2 in 1992 and all based on Child's Play 3 in 1993.
 Andy appears in the novelization of Child's Play 2 and the novelization of Child's Play 3.
 In 1999,  clips of Andy are shown in the television series Where Are They Now?, as part of the episode Horror Movie Stars.
 Andy is shown throughout the documentary Evil Comes in Small Packages, which was included as a special feature in the 20th anniversary edition of Child's Play in 2008.
  Archive footage of Andy is shown in the 2001 horror documentary Boogeymen: The Killer Compilation.

Reception
Alex Vincent's performance as Andy has been praised for being "one of the best child performances in a horror movie" and for being able to create an "emotional connection" with the audience. From his first scene in the movie to his sobbing in the hospital room he is able to bring out emotions that seem far too real. The article went on to say:
"Watching him sob alone in his tiny hospital room feels like seeing my own kid cry – but not the kind of crying when he doesn't get his way or stubs his toe. It's the kind of crying informed by genuine sadness. There is a hopelessness to the way Alex Vincent plays that scene that's impossible to reproduce. What makes his performance great is that it is totally, effortlessly authentic. He is not manufacturing motivation, nor calculating his delivery. He is reacting purely in the moment. When they are best friends, he interacts with Chucky like it's an actual toy that he loves (the way he excitedly talks to the doll way too loudly when they first interact is another great moment in the movie). When Chucky goes bad, Vincent's fear – and even heartbreak – is totally real."

Dustin Putman stated in a review that he was "always convincing as an endangered... son faced with an unthinkable terror." Another article went as far as to say Vincent's portrayal "was what made that series as much as Brad Dourif doing the voice of Chucky."

References

External links 
 Andy Barclay on IMDb

Child characters in film
Child's Play (franchise) characters
Fictional American military personnel
Fictional cadets
Fictional characters from Chicago
Fictional characters with post-traumatic stress disorder
Fictional torturers and interrogators
Film characters introduced in 1988
Teenage characters in film